The  University Hospital Association, formerly the Association of UK University Hospitals, is a leadership body for university hospitals in the UK established in 1998. Its main focus is in teaching and research. It has offices at Woburn House, Tavistock Square, London the headquarters of Universities UK. Katie Petty-Saphon is its Chief Executive.

Membership 
The association is a membership organisation made up of 47 UK university hospitals represented by their hospital Chief Executives. It also incorporates five affiliate groups and an informal group made up of the Chairs of each member hospital. The affiliate groups look at issues surrounding hospitals from the perspective of their specific role. They are:
 Directors of Finance
 Human Resources (HR) Directors
 Medical Directors
 Directors of Nursing
 Research & Development (R&D) Directors

It also hosts the National Clinical Academic Roles Development Group for Nurses, Midwives and Allied Health Professionals, an expert advisory group that works to promote clinical academia among nurses, midwives and allied health professionals.

Previous work 
The association has produced an ‘acuity/dependency’ tool for use in assessing nurse to patient ratios in hospital wards.

The association wrote to Monitor on behalf of its  English members to object to the NHS tariff proposals for 2015/6.  What is proposed includes a 3.8% efficiency target and a new marginal rate rule restricting payments for specialised services to 50% of normal rates for all activity above an agreed baseline.

See also Shelford Group.

References

External links
University Hospital Association

Organisations based in the London Borough of Camden
Teaching hospitals in the United Kingdom